The 2023 Florida Atlantic Owls football team will represent Florida Atlantic University in the 2023 NCAA Division I FBS football season.  The Owls will play their home games at FAU Stadium in Boca Raton, Florida, and compete in their first season as members of the American Athletic Conference (AAC). They are led by first-year head coach Tom Herman.

Previous season
The Owls finished the 2022 season 5–7, 4–4 in their final season of C-USA play to finish in a three-way tie for fourth place, barely missing bowl eligibility. Head Coach Willie Taggart was fired after the loss to Western Kentucky.

Transfers

Outgoing

Incoming

Schedule
Florida Atlantic and the American Athletic Conference (AAC) announced the 2023 football schedule on February 21, 2023.

Source:

Coaching staff

Source:

Game summaries

Monmouth

Ohio

at Clemson

at Illinois

Tulsa

at South Florida

UTSA

at Charlotte

at UAB

East Carolina

Tulane

at Rice

References

Florida Atlantic
Florida Atlantic Owls football seasons
Florida Atlantic Owls football